Hizabad-e Pain (also Romanized as Hīzābād-e Pā’īn and Hiz Abad Pa’in) is a village in Zaboli Rural District, in the Central District of Mehrestan County, Sistan and Baluchestan Province, Iran. At the 2006 census, its population was 205, in 47 families.

References 

Populated places in Mehrestan County